"Ey Sham" (translation: "Somewhere") is a song by Israeli singer Ilanit, written in Hebrew by Ehud Manor and composed by Nurit Hirsh, and recorded in several other languages. The song is 's debut entry at the Eurovision Song Contest, competing at its 1973 edition where it held the highest place record for a new country, and came close to top the Israeli Hebrew national charts for song of the year.

Lyrics
The song is a dramatic ballad, with Ilanit singing about coming to the sudden realisation of what she must do with her lover. She suggests that they "go now", in the hope that "somewhere / there together we'll find the garden / the garden of love". With the lyrics "there / I saw a rainbow... the morning rises in white" and "we fly beyond the clouds... we'll ask for the azure gardens", she alludes to a heavenly garden. From the tone of the performance, it appears that this is a hope that the pair can be themselves without pressure from others.

Ilanit recorded an English-language version of the song entitled "All Make Believe", an Italian version called "Lei” and a German version entitled "Weit so weit der Regenbogen reicht".

Eurovision Song Contest
The song is Israel's debut entry in the annual Eurovision Song Contest, and the first occasion on which a country from outside geographical Europe had competed in the contest. This apparent anomaly is explained by the fact the contest is open to all members of the European Broadcasting Union, an organisation which extends beyond Europe.

Written by Ehud Manor and composed by Nurit Hirsh, the two musicians also collaborated to produce the 1978 edition's winning Israeli entry, with Manor producing overall six more Israeli Eurovision entries. At the contest the song was also conducted by Hirsh, who along with the conductor for Sweden, showcased the first Eurovision edition to have a female conducting a competing entry.

At the contest the song was performed seventeenth and last, following 's Martine Clémenceau with "Sans toi". At the close of voting, it had received 97 points, placing fourth in a field of 17, which for the next 20 years held the contest's record for the highest placed debut for a country.

Despite this achievement, Ilanit stated she feels the song could have placed higher, as she discussed an argument over her desire for a composition which "attacks" the listener by starting with the refrain, exploiting the three-minute limitation rule of the contest's entries, against composer Hirsh decision to arrange the intro as "something artistic and mysterious".

With the song being Israel's first-ever Eurovision entry, Ilanit performed the first part of it during the opening segment of the Grand Final of the 2019 contest in Tel Aviv. The song was succeeded as Israeli representative at the 1974 contest by Poogy with "Natati La Khayay".

Chart positions
Ey sham ranked among the top songs for weeks during 1973 and for song of the year at the-then two main and only national Israeli charts for Hebrew songs, with the official one on the radio channel Reshet Gimmel which was operated by Kol Yisrael, and the other on the popular radio channel Galgalatz operated by the Israel Defense Forces Radio Galei Tzahal.

Year-end charts

References

External links

Eurovision songs of Israel
Eurovision songs of 1973
Songs with music by Nurit Hirsh
1973 songs